Jumeirah (  Emirati pronunciation) is a coastal residential area of Dubai, United Arab Emirates mainly comprising low rise private dwellings and hotel developments. It has both expensive and large detached properties as well as more modest town houses built in a variety of architectural styles. The area is popular with expatriates working in the emirate and is familiar to many tourists visiting Dubai.

History

Archaeological excavations at Jumeirah Archaeological Site, which was discovered in 1969, demonstrate that the area was inhabited as far back as the Abbasid era, approximately in the 10th century CE.

Historically, Emirati people living in Jumeirah were fishermen, pearl divers and traders. At the turn of the 20th century, it was a village of some 45 areesh (palm leaf) huts, inhabited mainly by settled Bedouin of the Bani Yas and Manasir tribes. At the time, Jumeirah was 'about 3 miles southwest of Dibai town'.

In modern times (1960 onwards), Jumeirah was the principal area for western expatriate residences. The beachfront area was previously called "Chicago Beach", as the site of the former Chicago Beach Hotel. The locale's peculiar name had its origins in the Chicago Bridge & Iron Company which at one time welded giant floating oil storage tankers called "Kazzans" on the site. The old name persisted for a time after the old hotel was demolished in 1997. "Dubai Chicago Beach Hotel" was the Public Project Name for the construction phase of the Burj Al Arab Hotel until Sheikh Mohammed bin Rashid Al Maktoum announced the new name: Burj Al Arab.

The Theatre of Digital Art (ToDA) opened in 2020 at Souk Madinat in Jumeirah as an exhibition space for digital art.

See also

 Jumeirah Beach
 Jumeirah Beach Hotel
 Jumeira Baccalaureate School
 Palm Jumeirah
 Jumeirah Mosque
 City Walk

References

External links

Archaeological site
 Jumeirah Archaeological Site, Dubai Culture & Arts Authority
 Lonelyplanet website

Majlis Ghorfat Umm Al-Sheif
 Majlis Ghorfat Umm Al Sheif, Dubai Culture & Arts Authority

 
Communities in Dubai
Populated coastal places in the United Arab Emirates